Belarus participated in the Eurovision Song Contest 2017 with the song "Story of My Life" written by Arciom Lukjanienka. The song was performed by the band Naviband. The Belarusian entry for the 2017 contest in Kyiv, Ukraine was selected through a national final organised by the Belarusian broadcaster National State Television and Radio Company of the Republic of Belarus (BTRC). The national final consisted of fourteen competing acts participating in a televised production where "Historyja majho žyccia" performed by Navi was selected as the winner following the combination of votes from a jury panel and public televoting. The song was later retitled as "Story of My Life" for the Eurovision Song Contest, while the band was renamed as Naviband.

Belarus was drawn to compete in the second semi-final of the Eurovision Song Contest which took place on 11 May 2017. Performing during the show in position 14, "Story of My Life" was announced among the top 10 entries of the second semi-final and therefore qualified to compete in the final on 13 May. It was later revealed that Belarus placed ninth out of the 18 participating countries in the semi-final with 110 points. In the final, Belarus performed in position 3 and placed seventeenth out of the 26 participating countries, scoring 83 points.

Background 

Prior to the 2017 contest, Belarus had participated in the Eurovision Song Contest thirteen times since its first entry in 2004. The nation's best placing in the contest was sixth, which it achieved in 2007 with the song "Work Your Magic" performed by Koldun. In 2016, Belarus failed to qualify to the final with the song "Help You Fly" performed by Ivan.

The Belarusian national broadcaster, National State Television and Radio Company of the Republic of Belarus (BTRC), broadcasts the event within Belarus and organises the selection process for the nation's entry. The broadcaster has used both internal selections and national finals to select the Belarusian entry for Eurovision in the past. Since 2012, BTRC has organised a national final in order to choose Belarus' entry, a selection procedure that continued for their 2017 entry.

Before Eurovision

National final
The Belarusian national final took place on 20 January 2017. Thirteen songs participated in the competition and the winner was selected through a jury and public televote. The show was broadcast on Belarus 1, Belarus 24 and Radius FM as well as online via the broadcaster's official website tvr.by.

Competing entries
Artists and composers were able to submit their applications and entries to the broadcaster between 4 November 2016 and 24 November 2016. At the closing of the deadline, 67 entries were received by the broadcaster. Auditions were held on 30 November 2016 at the BTRC "600 Metrov" studio where a jury panel was tasked with selecting up to fifteen entries to proceed to the televised national final. The auditions were webcast online at the official BTRC website. The jury consisted of Olga Salamakha (deputy director of the TV channel Belarus 1), Inna Mardusevich (chief specialist of the concert and festival art management projects of the Ministry of Culture of Belarus), Elena Treschinskaya (head of the radio station "Radius FM"), Dmitry Dolgolev, Oleg Averin (musician/composer), Ludmila Kutz (singer and vocal teacher), Sergei Andrianov (journalist), Mikhail Revutsky (head of the section of culture at TV Infoservice) and Evgeny Perlin (television host). Thirteen finalists were selected and announced on 30 November 2016.

Final
The televised final took place on 20 January 2017 at the "600 Metrov" studio in Minsk, hosted by Olga Ryzhikova and 2014 Belarusian Eurovision contestant Teo. Prior to the competition, a draw for the running order took place on 9 December 2016. A 50/50 combination of votes from seven jury members made up of music professionals and public televoting selected the song "Historyja majho žyccia" performed by Navi as the winner. The song became Belarus' first entry to be performed in the Belarusian language at the Eurovision Song Contest. The jury consisted of Valery Dayneko (chairman of the jury, singer), Olga Salamakha (deputy director of the TV channel Belarus 1), Elena Treshchinskaya (head of the radio station "Radius FM"), Alexander Kapenkin (director of the TV channel TV BelMuz), Vladimir Bogdan (producer, presenter, director of the radio station "Radio New"), Ludmila Kutz (singer and vocal teacher) and Inna Mardusevich (chief specialist of the concert and festival art management projects of the Ministry of Culture of Belarus).

In addition to the performances from the competitors, the show featured guest performances by the hosts Olga Ryzhikova and Teo, 2015 Belarusian Eurovision contestant Uzari and 2016 Belarusian Eurovision contestant Ivan.

Promotion 
Naviband made several appearances across Europe to specifically promote "Story of My Life" as the Belarusian Eurovision entry. On 25 March, Naviband performed during the Eurovision PreParty Riga, which was organised by OGAE Latvia and held at the Crystal Club Concert Hall in Riga. Between 3 and 6 April, Naviband took part in promotional activities in Tel Aviv, Israel where she performed during the Israel Calling event held at the Ha'teatron venue. On 8 April, Naviband performed during the Eurovision in Concert event which was held at the Melkweg venue in Amsterdam, Netherlands and hosted by Cornald Maas and Selma Björnsdóttir.

At Eurovision 
According to Eurovision rules, all nations with the exceptions of the host country and the "Big Five" (France, Germany, Italy, Spain and the United Kingdom) are required to qualify from one of two semi-finals in order to compete for the final; the top ten countries from each semi-final progress to the final. The European Broadcasting Union (EBU) split up the competing countries into six different pots based on voting patterns from previous contests, with countries with favourable voting histories put into the same pot. On 31 January 2017, a special allocation draw was held which placed each country into one of the two semi-finals, as well as which half of the show they would perform in. Belarus placed into the second semi-final, to be held on 11 May 2017, and was scheduled to perform in the second half of the show.

Once all the competing songs for the 2017 contest had been released, the running order for the semi-finals was decided by the shows' producers rather than through another draw, so that similar songs were not placed next to each other. Belarus was set to perform in position 15, following the entry from Switzerland and before the entry from Bulgaria. But after Russia was removed from the running order of the competition following their withdrawal from the contest, Belarus' position shifted to 14.

The two semi-finals and the final were broadcast in Belarus on Belarus 1 and Belarus 24 with commentary by Evgeny Perlin. The Belarusian spokesperson, who announce the top 12-point score awarded by the Belarusian jury during the final, was 2013 Belarusian representative Alyona Lanskaya.

Semi-final 

Naviband took part in technical rehearsals on 3 and 6 May, followed by dress rehearsals on 10 and 11 May. This included the jury show on 10 May where the professional juries of each country watched and voted on the competing entries.

The Belarusian performance featured the members of Naviband performing on a boat prop on stage with two large spinning fans. The band were in white outfits: Arciom Lukjanienka wore a tan waistcoat, while Kseniya Zhuk wore a long flowing white dress. The LED screens displayed a fast moving cloudy sky, a large blue globe and traditional symbols, while the performance also featured smoke and pyrotechnic effects. Naviband was joined by four off-stage backing vocalists: Alena Verbitskaya, Anna Chet, Michael Soul and Olga Rozaleon-Sashalskaya.

At the end of the show, Belarus was announced as having finished in the top 10 and subsequently qualifying for the grand final. It was later revealed that Belarus placed ninth in the semi-final, receiving a total of 110 points: 55 points from both the televoting and the juries.

Final 
Shortly after the second semi-final, a winners' press conference was held for the ten qualifying countries. As part of this press conference, the qualifying artists took part in a draw to determine which half of the grand final they would subsequently participate in. This draw was done in the reverse order the countries appeared in the semi-final running order. Belarus was drawn to compete in the first half. Following this draw, the shows' producers decided upon the running order of the final, as they had done for the semi-finals. Belarus was subsequently placed to perform in position 3, following the entry from Poland and before the entry from Austria.

Naviband once again took part in dress rehearsals on 12 and 13 May before the final, including the jury final where the professional juries cast their final votes before the live show. The band performed a repeat of their semi-final performance during the final on 14 May. Belarus placed sixteenth in the final, scoring 83 points: 33 points from the televoting and 50 points from the juries.

Voting 
Voting during the three shows involved each country awarding two sets of points from 1-8, 10 and 12: one from their professional jury and the other from televoting. Each nation's jury consisted of five music industry professionals who are citizens of the country they represent, with their names published before the contest to ensure transparency. This jury judged each entry based on: vocal capacity; the stage performance; the song's composition and originality; and the overall impression by the act. In addition, no member of a national jury was permitted to be related in any way to any of the competing acts in such a way that they cannot vote impartially and independently. The individual rankings of each jury member as well as the nation's televoting results were released shortly after the grand final.

Below is a breakdown of points awarded to Belarus and awarded by Belarus in the second semi-final and grand final of the contest, and the breakdown of the jury voting and televoting conducted during the two shows:

Points awarded to Belarus

Points awarded by Belarus

Detailed voting results
The following members comprised the Belarusian jury:
 Inna Mardusevich (jury chairperson)chief specialist of the concert and festival art management projects of the Ministry of Culture of Belarus
 Ludmila Kutssinger and vocal teacher
 singer
 singer
 Leonid Shirincomposer, guitarist, arranger, poet, sound director

References

External links 

2017
Countries in the Eurovision Song Contest 2017
Eurovision